Pot Luck is an album performed by the Ramsey Lewis Trio which was recorded in 1963 and released on the Argo label.

Reception

Allmusic awarded the album 2 stars.

Track listing
All compositions by Ramsey Lewis except as indicated
 "Andaluza" (Enrique Granados) - 3:20   
 "Look-A-Here" - 4:00   
 "Arrivederci Roma" (Renato Rascel, Carl Sigman) - 5:35   
 "I Gave My Love a Cherry" (Traditional) - 4:45   
 "Loch Lomond" (Traditional) - 3:20   
 "We Blew It, Again!" - 5:10   
 "Nature Boy" (eden ahbez) - 3:15   
 "I Remember the Starlight" (Giacomo Puccini) - 6:10   
 "Shenandoah" (Traditional) - 4:08   
 "Swamp Girl" (Eldee Young) - 2:00

Personnel 
Ramsey Lewis - piano
Eldee Young - bass
Issac "Red" Holt - drums

References 

1963 albums
Ramsey Lewis albums
Argo Records albums
Albums produced by Esmond Edwards